Silje Reinåmo (born 25 August 1982) is a Norwegian actress, dancer, and musical performer.

She was born in Mosjøen and was educated at Bårdar Danseinstitutt in Oslo, and at the Guildford School of Acting in Surrey, England. Reinåmo is perhaps best known for her lead performance in the supernatural horror film Thale and for her portrayal of Solveig in Bentein Baardson's production of Henrik Ibsen's Peer Gynt in Cairo in 2006. She has performed in several productions for television, film and the theatre, notably with a leading role in the short film In Chambers (Norwegian title: Bak lukkede dører), which received an award for Best Short Film at the WT Os international film festival in 2008, as well as awards for Best film and NIFA best film at the Minimalen short film festival in Trondheim in 2009.

Performances

Theatre

Film

Television

References

External links

1982 births
Living people
People from Vefsn
Norwegian stage actresses
Norwegian female dancers
Norwegian film actresses
Norwegian television actresses